After George Floyd, an unarmed African-American man, was murdered by a white police officer, Derek Chauvin, during an arrest in Minneapolis, Minnesota, on May 25, 2020, many people protested against systemic racism, both in the United States and internationally. During the course of these protests, many monuments and memorials were vandalized or toppled by protestors, prompting those people who were in charge of other similar monuments to remove them from public view. Similarly, many names, mascots, and other controversial forms of symbolism were either changed or removed under direct or indirect public pressure. In other countries, race-related and colonial issues were also raised, and some of them were acted upon. In some cases, changes were already being planned or they had already been under consideration before the outbreak of the protests.

Color code:

Abbreviations used: 
 ES: Elementary school
 HS: High school
 MS: Middle school
 TBD: To be determined

Education

Geography

Government

Industry

Food and drink

Healthcare

Lodging

Music

Sports

Terminology

Museums

Decision pending

Proposals with official backing

See also
List of monuments and memorials removed during the George Floyd protests
List of U.S. Army installations named for Confederate soldiers
Native American mascot controversy
Weinstein effect

Notes

References

Further reading 
 
St. Clair, Jeff (June 5, 2021). "Monuments And Teams Have Changed Names As America Reckons With Racism. Birds Are Next" NPR.

Aftermath of the George Floyd protests
Naming controversies